Peninsula Township, which comprises the Old Mission Peninsula, is a civil township of Grand Traverse County in the U.S. state of Michigan. Located in the Northern Lower Peninsula, Peninsula Township is part of the Traverse City micropolitan area, sharing a southern border with Traverse City. Peninsula Township had a population of 6,068 as of the 2020 census, an increase from 5,433 at the 2010 census. The township is well known for its cherry harvest and viticulture, and is included in the Old Mission Peninsula AVA, a federally recognized viticultural region.  

Geographically, the Old Mission Peninsula extends about  into Grand Traverse Bay (a bay of Lake Michigan). The peninsula divides the Grand Traverse Bay into an East Arm and West Arm. 

Power Island, an island in the West Arm of Grand Traverse Bay, is politically part of Peninsula Township.

History 
The settlement at Old Mission was the first community founded by Europeans in the Grand Traverse Bay region, as a duty of the federal government under the Treaty of Washington (1836). It was founded in May 1839 by Rev. Peter Dougherty and Rev. John Fleming. They had spent the winter on Mackinac Island, and founded a Presbyterian mission at the small Old Mission Harbor, which of course did not yet have that name. The location is a convenient and strategic location along canoe routes between native settlements in the Grand Traverse Bay region. At the time of their arrival there were a few Native American residents of what appeared to be a nearly abandoned village at the harbor. These natives made smoke signals over their watch fire to summon a substantial number of men of the tribe to canoe across the bay to join the visitors for a multi-day parlay. The mission had peaceful relations with native residents in the surrounding area. The settlement was originally known as Grand Traverse.

In June of 1839 Henry Schoolcraft arrived at the mission in a small vessel and helped found a school there. By 1841 a seasonal village that was important for sheltering tribal members during trading expeditions, hunts, fishing endeavors, and gathering nearby wild rice had grown to a permanent village, with 5 log buildings as well as several wigwams at the settlement. By 1850 the settlement had grown to a considerable size, and the schooner Arrow was making weekly trips to the mission from Mackinaw City.

In 1851, a post office was established in Grand Traverse, with W.R. Stone as first postmaster. This was the only official post office in the Grand Traverse Bay region, indeed the only one between Mackinaw City and Croton. In 1852, Rev. Dougherty decided to move his mission across the west bay along the Leelanau Peninsula to an existing Native American village at the site of modern Omena, thus establishing a "New Mission." The previous community was nicknamed as the "Old Mission" in the early 1850s. By the time of the civil war, the Presbyterian organization which funded Dougherty had financial difficulty, and missionary activities were discontinued. Dougherty sold his land there in 1868.

In 1852, the U.S. Postal Service, in consultation with Albert Tracy Lay, a founding father of Traverse City, decided to rename the post office at Grand Traverse to "Old Mission" and named the post office at the Boardman River from "Grand Traverse City" to "Traverse City", as the former was too long a name per post office guidelines.

In 1853, Peninsula Township was organized as one of Grand Traverse County's first two townships, the other being Traverse Township (taking up all of mainland Grand Traverse County, excluding the Old Mission Peninsula).

Beginning in the early 1940s, the Michigan State Highway Department (now MDOT) constructed Center Road to allow for easier access up the peninsula, with motorists previously having to remain on narrow and winding shoreline roads. Center Road is today the northernmost leg of state trunkline highway M-37.

Geography 
Peninsula Township contains the landmass known as the Old Mission Peninsula, and Power Island. According to the United States Census Bureau, the township has a total area of 31.8 square miles (82.5 km), of which 27.9 square miles (72.2 km) is land and 4.0 square miles (10.3 km) (13%) is water.

Old Mission Peninsula 
The peninsula separates Grand Traverse Bay into its West Arm and East Arm. Additionally, the peninsula is adjacent to Bowers Harbor and Old Mission Harbor, smaller inlets of the West Arm and East Arm, respectively. At its widest, the peninsula is only about 3.25 miles shore-to-shore (5.23 kilometers). Unlike the rest of mainland Grand Traverse County, the Old Mission Peninsula, like the neighboring Leelanau Peninsula, has unusually steep and rising terrain for the region. The northern end of the peninsula, however, is much flatter than the rest, and is a part of the Antrim–Charlevoix Drumlin Field.

Major highway 

  (historically known as Center Road) runs for  along the backbone of the peninsula, terminating in a cul-de-sac at Old Mission Point. It was designated what is now known as a Pure Michigan Byway Scenic Route in June 2007. The M-37 Scenic Heritage Route proposal is itself a unique resource concerning the character of the peninsula, and the activities along this byway. South of the peninsula, in Traverse City, M-37 intersects highways US 31 and M-72.

Communities 
Archie was given a post office in 1885, which lasted until September 1900. The post office reopened the following December, but was closed again in 1902.
Mapleton was founded in 1859 by the Ogden family of New York state, with a post office opening the same year. The post office lasted until 1904. Today, despite being a small community, Mapleton is marked by signage along M-37.
The word "Neahtawanta" derives from Ojibwe words meaning "placid waters", in reference to Bowers Harbor. Neahtawanta was established in 1890 by the Neahtawanta Association, and a post office was established in 1907, only lasting until 1914. Today, Neahtawanta is still occupied by large summer resort homes, and the Neahtawanta Inn remains open.
Ogdensburg was founded by the same Ogden family in 1855, and was one of the region's first settlements. Today, all that remains is a cemetery.
Traverse City is immediately adjacent Peninsula Township, bordering it to the south. Much of the south of Peninsula Township has suburbanized due to its proximity to Traverse City. Traverse City, though, is politically independent of Peninsula Township, and the two are administered separately.

Demographics 
As of the census of 2000, there were 5,265 people, 2,131 households, and 1,625 families residing in the township. The racial makeup of the township was 97.28% White, 0.06% African American, 0.36% Native American, 0.59% Asian, 0.97% from other races, and 0.74% from two or more races. Hispanic or Latino of any race were 2.01% of the population.

There were 2,131 households, out of which 27.5% had children under the age of 18 living with them, 70.4% were married couples living together, 4.7% had a female householder with no husband present, and 23.7% were non-families. 20.6% of all households were made up of individuals, and 10.5% had someone living alone who was 65 years of age or older.  The average household size was 2.45 and the average family size was 2.84.

In the township the population was spread out, with 23.1% under the age of 18, 4.2% from 18 to 24, 19.3% from 25 to 44, 33.5% from 45 to 64, and 19.9% who were 65 years of age or older.  The median age was 47 years. For every 100 females, there were 94.1 males.  For every 100 females age 18 and over, there were 91.9 males.

The median income for a household in the township was $66,019, and the median income for a family was $82,426. Males had a median income of $52,750 versus $34,620 for females. The per capita income for the township was $40,753.  About 1.1% of families and 2.3% of the population were below the poverty line, including 0.3% of those under age 18 and 2.3% of those age 65 or over.

Recreation 
The "Old Mission Peninsula Cruise" is considered to be a "serendipitous" adventure for road bike riders. It is favored by local riders, including bicycle clubs, because of the scenery, the quality of the road, and lack of traffic.
The peninsula is a great place to sea kayak. The bay offers a shelter from the prevailing westerly winds and from the Lake Michigan waves. One can get close to shore, the lighthouse, picnic grounds and parks. Maps, rentals and guided tours are available.
There are many recurrent and special events. A calendar is available.

Produce

Wineries 
There are eleven wineries on the Old Mission Peninsula.  The Old Mission Peninsula sits close to the 45th parallel, a latitude known for growing prestigious grapes. The two Grand Traverse Bays provide the ideal maritime climate and the rich soil does the rest. Northern Michigan specializes in growing white grapes and is known for its Rieslings which grow well in the summer months and late fall which Traverse City is known for. Every October the wineries host a harvest fest.  Some Riesling grapes are spared being picked in the fall to be picked when they freeze, from which Ice Wine is made.  The wineries along the Old Mission Peninsula are 2 Lads Winery, Black Star Farms, Bonobo Winery, Bowers Harbor Vineyards, Brys Estate Vineyard & Winery, Chateau Chantal Winery And Inn, Chateau Grand Traverse, Hawthorne Vineyards,  Mari Vineyards, Tabone Vineyards and Peninsula Cellars.

Spirits and breweries 
The peninsula's only distillery, Civilized Spirits, occupies a site which has been used for distilling since the late 1800s - when it was built by lumber baron J.W. Stickney and his wife Genevive. Civilized Spirits products include: White Dog Whiskey, Whiskey, Rum, Gin, Single Malt Whiskey, and vodka - including a vodka distilled from cherries.

The Jolly Pumpkin Restaurant & Brewery is situated among the cherry orchards and lakes of northern Michigan. It serves pizzas, sandwiches, entrees, wine and beer. Old Mission Beer Co. products are brewed by Mike Hall and Mike Wooster on Old Mission Peninsula. These beers are available in Jolly Pumpkin Restaurant & Brewery.

References

Further reading 
Clarke Historical Library, Central, Michigan University, Bibliography for Grand Traverse County
Potter, Elizabeth V. The Story of Old Mission. (Ann Arbor, MI: Edward Brothers, 1956).

External links 
Peninsula Township

Townships in Grand Traverse County, Michigan
Traverse City micropolitan area
Townships in Michigan